Brezovice may refer to the following villages:

Bosnia and Herzegovina 
 Brezovice (Čajniče), Republika Srpska
 Brezovice (Pale), Republika Srpska
 Brezovice (Srebrenica), Republika Srpska

Czech Republic 
 Březovice, Mladá Boleslav District, Central Bohemian Region

Kosovo 
 Brezovica, Kosovo or Brezovicë, Štrpce municipality

Serbia 
 Brezovice (Krupanj), Mačva District
 Brezovice (Valjevo), Kolubara District

See also 
 Brezovec (disambiguation)
 Brezovica (disambiguation)